Too Late the Hero is the fifth solo studio album by English rock musician John Entwistle, released on 23 November 1981 by ATCO Records in the US, and by WEA in the UK. This was his only solo studio album of the 1980s and his last album to chart. The album peaked at No. 71 on the US Billboard 200, making it his best-selling album and his only album to reach the Top 100.

"Talk Dirty" was the first single released from the album and it received some airplay in the US on album-oriented rock radio, peaking at No. 41 on the US Mainstream Rock Tracks chart. "Too Late the Hero" was the second single to be released from the album and it would be his only single to chart on the UK Singles Chart, peaking at No. 76. It also peaked at No. 101 on the US Billboard Bubbling Under Hot 100 chart, making it his best-selling single all round. "Too Late the Hero" was the only single from the album that had a music video filmed for it.

The album was recorded as a core trio of musicians that were Entwistle on bass guitar with Joe Walsh of the Eagles providing all guitar work and Walsh's former Barnstorm bandmate Joe Vitale on drums. Billy Nicholls also sang backing vocals on most of the tracks.

Cover
The album cover is an assemblage of photographs taken by Gered Mankowitz. It depicts Entwistle with an Alembic Explorer bass guitar over grainy photos of him dressed as various heroes. The red suit and ankle boots worn by Entwistle were later sold at auction.

Composition
The album was Entwistle's first solo studio album in six years. "I had stopped writing because I thought I was going in the wrong direction with the 'shoo-bop, shoo-bop,' old rock & roll stuff on Rigor Mortis Sets In and Mad Dog. When I started writing again, I went back to the kind of material I was writing before those albums."

"Until about two years ago, I tried to stay away from certain subjects. I was getting a feeling from everyone – from the fans right through my wife and family – that if you write about hookers, you must go to hookers, and if you write about drugs, you must take drugs. I got this reputation for sinister black humour after things like Whistle Rymes, when I was getting up at six in the morning to feed my son, Christopher, and then sitting down at the piano at seven to write songs about peeping Toms and suicide cases."

Recording
The album was recorded over a couple of years, during those infrequent months when both Entwistle and long-time friend Joe Walsh were free (Walsh's James Gang toured extensively with the Who in the early seventies, and the two  had planned to collaborate for years).

Critical reception

In the AllMusic review by Ben Davies, he praises the contributions of Joe Walsh on lead guitar and Joe Vitale on drums, but says that they were unable to save the album from being boring. The reviewer concedes that the combination of these musicians would have seemed, "Like something of a dream proposition back in the 1970s," making the album an even bigger disappointment. MusicHound Rock: The Essential Album Guide awarded the album zero stars, calling it "a misguided, overblown collaboration with the severely unwitty Joe Walsh." The Rolling Stone Album Guide conceded that it "rocks capably."

Track listing

Non-album track

Personnel
Credits are adapted from the Too Late the Hero liner notes.

Musicians
 John Entwistle — vocals; bass guitar; eight-string bass guitar; piano; synthesizers
 Joe Walsh — acoustic and electric guitars; piano; cabassa; waste container; tambourine; limps; synthesizer
 Joe Vitale — drums; percussion; piano; flute; clavinet; timpani; metronome
 Billy Nicholls — backing vocals (1, 3–6, 9)

Production and artwork
 John Entwistle — producer
 Dave "Cyrano" Langston — producer
 Joe Walsh — executive producer
 Joe Vitale — executive producer
 Dave "Cyrano" Langston — engineering
 Neil Hornby — assistant engineer
 Jim Hill — assistant engineer
 Jeff Eccles — assistant engineer
 Mike Reese — mastering
 Gered Mankowitz — album cover design, concept, cover photo, photography

Charts

References

External links
 

1981 albums
John Entwistle albums
Atco Records albums
New wave albums by English artists